Ratan  Nath Dhar Sarshar (1846 or 1847 – 21 January 1903) was an Indian Urdu novelist, columnist and editor from British India. Born into a Kashmiri Brahmin family which settled in Lucknow, he received his education at Canning College and later took up employment as a schoolteacher. In August 1878, he was appointed editor of the Lucknow-based newspaper Avadh Akhbar, in which his most famous work Fasana-e-Azad was published serially.

Biography
Sarshar's date of birth is uncertain. Most probably he was born in 1846 or 1847. He was born in Kashmiri Brahmin (a group well known for their proficiency in Persian and Urdu) family. His father, Pandit Bej Nath Dhar, a trader who immigrated from Kashmir to Lucknow, died when Sarshar was four years old; thereafter Sarshar was brought up by his mother. Sarshar was initially schooled in the traditional way by learning Arabic and Persian at a local maktab (primary school).

Sarshar joined, for his schooling, the Canning College (which later migrated into University of Lucknow), but left without taking a degree. In 1878, he joined Avadh Akhbar as its editor.

In 1895, Sarshar moved to Hyderabad where he was engaged to Maharaja Sir Kishen Pershad to correct and improve upon his prose writings and poetic composition. Sarshar also edited a journal, Dabdaba-e-Asifi.

He died on 21 January 1903 at Hyderabad due to heavy drinking.

Works
The historian Ram Babu Saksena called Sarshar 'a most remarkable figure' in the last decade of nineteenth century.

His serialized novel Fasana-e-Azad (The Tale of Azad), which appeared between 1878 and 1883 as a regular supplement in his paper, was influenced by novels like The Pickwick Papers and Don Quixote, as well as the epic romances (dastan) of Persian and Urdu. Spanning over three thousand pages, the novel narrates the adventures of the protagonist, Azad, through the streets of Lucknow to the battlefields of the Russo-Turkish War (1877–1878). It was first published in 1881 by Munshi Naval Kishore Press. Sarshar gave copyrights of Fasana-e-Azad to Munshi Naval Kishore of Lucknow who also published Talism Hoshruba. Fasana-e-Azad was translated into Hindi as Azad Katha by Premchand, who also translated Sarshar's Sair-i-Kohsar as Parvat Yatra. Satirist Sharad Joshi also penned a Hindi TV serial Wah Janaab based on Fasana-e-Azad which ran successfully on the state-run television channel Doordarshan in the 1980s.

His other novels are Sair-i-Kohsar and Jam-i-Sarshar. His novel Gor-i-Ghariban remained unpublished due to his accidental death. His novel Khuda-e-Foujdar is translation of Don Quixote.

References

External links
 
 Azad Goes to a Railway Restaurant by Ratan Nath Dar 'Sarshar' (translated by Frances W. Pritchett)

Indian people of Kashmiri descent
Kashmiri people
Kashmiri Hindus
Kashmiri Pandits
Kashmiri Brahmins
Kashmiri writers
Writers from Lucknow
Date of birth uncertain
1903 deaths
Urdu-language novelists
Urdu-language writers from British India
Urdu-language translators
Urdu-language essayists
Urdu-language poets from India
Urdu-language humorists
19th-century Indian poets
Novelists from Uttar Pradesh
19th-century Indian novelists
19th-century Indian translators
Indian newspaper editors
Translators of Don Quixote
Translators of One Thousand and One Nights